Turkey competed at the 2013 Summer Universiade in Kazan, Russia from 6 July to 17 July 2013. A total of 82 athletes were a part of the Turkish team competing in ten sports branches.

Turkey won seven medals (29th place), including two gold and five bronze medals.

Medal table

Athletics 

Men's

Women's

Beach volleyball 

Men's tournament
Team:
Hakan Göğtepe, Volkan Göğtepe

Preliminary round
Group J

|}

Playoff round

Belt wrestling 

Men's Classic style

Men's Freestyle

Women's Freestyle

Boxing 

Men's

Football 

Men's tournament
Team

Preliminary round

Playoff round
9th–16th place

13th–16th place

13th place game

Final standing

Scorers
: Mehmet Alaeddinoğlu, Fatih Çakır
: Eser Şen, Sinan Osmanoğlu, Yusuf Türk, Çağlar Yıldırım

Gymnastics, artistic 

Men's
Individual all-around

Parallel bars

Judo 

Men's

Women's

Synchronized swimming 

Women's

Weightlifting 

Men's

Women's

Wrestling 

Men's Greco-Roman

Men's Freestyle

Women's Freestyle

References

External links
 27th Summer Universiade in Kazan, July 6–17 2013 – Result book

Nations at the 2013 Summer Universiade
Summer Universiade
2013